This is a timeline documenting the events of heavy metal in the year 2009.

Reformed bands
 Accept
 Arcturus
 Ark
 Autopsy
 Beherit
 Beneath the Sky
 Creed
 The Crown
 Decapitated
 Faith No More
 Gorguts
 Saint Vitus (few shows only)
 Steel Attack
 To/Die/For
 Unanimated
 Year of Desolation

Disbandments
 After Forever
 Angelcorpse
 Animosity
 Battle of Mice
 Burnt by the Sun
 Burst
 Divinity Destroyed
 Falchion
 God Seed
 Gorefest
 Grief
 Lock Up
 Lord Belial
 Metal Church
 Nothingface
 The Old Dead Tree
 Opiate for the Masses
Running Wild
 Subzero
 To/Die/For
 Twilightning
 xDEATHSTARx

Events
 Iron Maiden complete their globe-trotting Somewhere Back in Time World Tour, playing 90 shows in 38 countries.
 Iron Maiden become first heavy metal band to win a Brit Award, winning the Best Live Act at the awards ceremony.
 Former Arsis guitarist Ryan Knight joins The Black Dahlia Murder in late January, replacing John Kempainen, who had left the band in early December 2008.
 Guitarist Doug Weber leaves Terror in January, and is replaced by former No Warning guitarist Jordan Posner.
 Metallica is inducted into the Rock and Roll Hall of Fame on 4 April,.
 Cannibal Corpse wins "Greatest Death Metal Song" with "Hammer Smashed Face" in a poll on the Metal Hammer website. Arch Enemy came second with "We Will Rise", Death third with "Crystal Mountain"
 Metallica's 2008 album, Death Magnetic is nominated for four Grammy categories, winning Best Recording Package and Best Metal Performance for "My Apocalypse".
 Finnish metal band Norther parts ways with longtime singer/guitarist Petri Lindroos. Norther has also announced Aleksi Sihvonen (Medicated, ex-Imperanon) as their replacement vocalist.
 Varg Vikernes is released from prison after 16 years of incarceration for the murder of Øystein Aarseth (aka Euronymous), guitarist of Mayhem and owner of Deathlike Silence Productions record label that Burzum was signed to. Varg was also convicted for setting fire to three churches.
 The Gorgoroth name dispute is concluded with a court verdict recognising Gorgoroth founding member Infernus as the legitimate user of the band name. Contestants Gaahl and King ov Hell form God Seed, but Gaahl retires from metal within a few months and King forms Ov Hell with Shagrath.
 Susperia vocalist Athera suffered a heart attack. He has been diagnosed with a rare genetic disorder and is to undergo a triple heart bypass. On Monday, 16 March 2009 at Rikshospitalet University Hospital in Oslo, Norway, Athera successfully underwent open heart surgery. Surgeons also discovered further problems which resulted in the vocalist also having a main artery – which previously ran to his lungs – connected directly to his heart.
 Dimmu Borgir's Dariusz "Daray" Brzozowski ranked No. 1 drummer in Poland's "Top Drummer" magazine.
 Shadows Fall have announced the formation of their own label in conjunction with Warner Music Group's Independent Label Group and Ferret Music.
 Sonic Syndicate clean vocalist Roland Johansson quits the band.
 Original Arsis drummer Michael VanDyne returns to the band full-time.
 God Forbid has confirmed that rhythm guitarist Dallas Coyle has left the band. They also announced that former Darkest Hour guitarist Kris Norris will be his replacement.
 Sentenced's former lead guitarist Miika Tenkula is found dead on his home; his demise was caused by a heart attack due to a genetic condition. His overall health was presumably worsened by his heavy drinking problem.
 Satyricon bassist Victor Brandt quits the band in April.
 Venom drummer Antton leaves the band to focus on his other musical projects.
 Megadeth and Slayer to co-headline "Canadian Carnage" with Machine Head and Suicide Silence.
 Alexi Laiho from Children of Bodom breaks arm on tour.
 Rigor Mortis guitarist Mike Scaccia to undergo emergency neck surgery. The MRI scan noticed Scaccia has a Cervical Herniated Disc in his lower neck, which could make him paralyzed without immediate surgery.
 Dead to Fall announces farewell show.
 Carpathian Forest guitarist/bassist Tchort leaves the band in May.
 Kataklysm guitarist Jean-Francois Dagenais detained by the FBI. He was arrested and detained for over 5 hours under the presumption of being on the FBI international most wanted list, which he was falsely accused.
 Every Time I Die parts ways with drummer Mike "Ratboy" Novak, who has been with the band for 11 years.
 Deep Purple are issued a fine in Russia for "illegally" playing their own songs in Rostov-on-Don in October 2008.
Brainstorm sign to AFM Records.
On 8 July 2009, founding member and original Crimson Glory frontman Midnight died.
Jørn Lande returns to Masterplan.
Megadeth frontman Dave Mustaine undergoes neck surgery.
The Bled signs to Rise Records.
Sonic Syndicate announces new vocalist, Nathan James Biggs.
 ICS Vortex and Mustis leaves Dimmu Borgir.
 Destruction guitarist Mike Sifringer breaks his ring finger in Belgium.
 Former 3 Inches of Blood bassist Brian Redman died on Saturday 27 September, in a car crash near his home in Tacoma, Washington.
Evile bassist Mike Alexander fell ill and died at the age of 32 on 5 October, in Luleå, Sweden.
In a partnership between Earache Records and RapidShare, the Irish thrash metal band Gama Bomb made its third studio album, Tales from the Grave in Space, available for free download on 5 November 2009.
Steven Tyler is laid off from Aerosmith on 14 November 2009. The lay-off was due to multiple factors, being redundancies in the singing-songwriting division, and rising rehab fees that have cost the group millions.
Mercenary parts ways with drummer Mike Park, vocalist Mikke Sandager and keyboard player Morten Sandager.
Death and Control Denied's former guitarist Shannon Hamm suffers a heart attack at home on 1 October,.
Ronnie James Dio is diagnosed with stomach cancer, and is being treated at the Mayo Clinic.
On 28 December, The Rev, the drummer of Avenged Sevenfold, was found dead at his home in Huntington Beach.

Books 
ECW Press will release a book looking at the work of producer Rick Rubin, entitled Rick Rubin: In the Studio, written by biographer Jake Brown on 11 August,.
 Former Stratovarius member Timo Tolkki is to publish his autobiography, Hymn to Life – Entr'acte on 2 November, through Goldenworks Ltd./Blacksmith Ltd.
 At the End of the Day, a book charting the career of Blaze Bayley is to be released on 25 September,.
 All That Matters, a Metallica biography written by Paul Stenning is to be released in October via Plexus Publishing.
 Led Zeppelin: Good Times, Bad Times: A Visual Biography, a book examining the public and private lives of the members of Led Zeppelin, is to be released on 1 October, via Abrams Publishing.
 Rock photographer Neil Zlozower releases Mötley Crüe: A Visual History, 1983–2005 via Chronicle Books.
 A limited-edition book, Vintage Kiss Photos: 1974–1981 compiled by Marc Scallatino, is releaded, charting Kiss's early days.
 Cradle of Filth frontman Dani Filth and Gavin Baddeley are to release The Gospel of Filth, a book exploring the history of the band and more general topics of the dark side of humanity, on 31 October,.
New book announced on the history of metal titled Louder Than Hell: The Unflinching Oral History of Metal.
 Rudolf Schenker of the Scorpions will release his autobiography, entitled Rock Your Life in Germany on 14 October,.
 Heavy metal magazine Decibel will release Precious Metal: The Stories Behind 25 Extreme Metal Masterpieces in July. The book pays tribute to the 25 most influential extreme metal albums of all time. Some of the albums listed include: Slayer's Reign in Blood, Cannibal Corpse's Tomb of the Mutilated, Converge's Jane Doe and Meshuggah's Destroy Erase Improve.
 All Pens Blazing, a heavy metal writer's handbook containing interviews and a history of heavy metal publications, is released on 16 August,.
 Ozzy Osbourne is to release his autobiography, "I Am Ozzy" on 1 October,.
 Bazillion Points Books are to release Only Death is Real: An Illustrated History of Hellhammer and Early Celtic Frost, a book exploring the bands Hellhammer and Celtic Frost written by band members Tom Fischer and Martin Eric Ain, in November 2009.
 Two books came from author Joel McIver, the first called The 100 Greatest Metal Guitarists with a foreword by Glen Benton of Deicide and the second titled To Live Is To Die: The Life And Death of Metallica's Cliff Burton, with a foreword by Kirk Hammett.

Films
On 8 December, Bill Zebub will release Pagan Metal: A Documentary, the first documentary about pagan and folk metal.

Albums released

January

February

March

April

May

June

July

August

September

October

November

December

References

External links 
About.com: Heavy Metal

2000s in heavy metal music
Metal